Shklo is an urban-type settlement in Yavoriv Raion, Lviv Oblast, in southwest Ukraine. It belongs to Novoiavorivsk urban hromada, one of the hromadas of Ukraine. Population: . 

Sanatorium treatment 
In the village located sanatorium “Shklo” He is rich in the unique combination of natural medicinal factors. There are drinkable sources of slightly mineralised water “Naftusia-Shklo”, hydrogen-sulphidous springs of high and middle mineralization and peaty-mineral medicinal muds.

Culture 
The village has two sights of architecture Yavoriv district:
 Church of St. Paraskeva (wooden) 1732  (1454 /1).
 The bell tower of the church of St. Paraskeva (wooden) 1732 (1454 /2).

And the village has one sight of architecture local importance:
 The Parish School of the 18th century. (556–м).

Personalities 
 Hordynsky Yaroslav Antonovich (1882-1939) –-  Ukrainian literary critic, literary historian, translator, teacher. Full member of the Shevchenko Scientific Society.

References

Sources 
 История Городов и Сёл.  Шкло,  Яворовский район - Львовская область

External links 
 weather.in.ua
 Javorivs'kyj rajon (District). Šklo (Shklo)

Urban-type settlements in Yavoriv Raion